The Minister for Foreign Affairs is a senior minister in the Government of Ireland and leads the Department of Foreign Affairs.

The Minister's office is located at Iveagh House, on St Stephen's Green in Dublin; "Iveagh House" is often used as a metonym for the department as a whole. From 1922 until 1971 the title of the office was "Minister for External Affairs".

The current office holder is Micheál Martin, TD. He is also Minister for Defence.

He is assisted by:
Peter Burke, TD – Minister of State for European Affairs
Seán Fleming, TD – Minister of State for International Development and Diaspora

Overview

The department has the following divisions:
 Finance Unit – oversees the financial control of the department.
 Anglo-Irish Division – deals with Anglo-Irish relations and Northern Ireland.
 Cultural Division – administers the state's Cultural Relations Programme.
 European Union Division – coordinates the state's approach within the European Union (EU).
 Development Cooperation Division – responsible for the Irish Aid programme and for Irish international development policy.
 Passport and Consular Division – is responsible for the issuing of passports to Irish citizens.
 Political Division – is responsible for international political issues and manages the state's participation in the EU's Common Foreign and Security Policy.
 Protocol Division – is responsible for the organisation and management of visits of VIPs to the state and of visits abroad by the President of Ireland.

The minister has responsibility for the relations between Ireland and foreign states. The department defines its role as: "The Department of Foreign Affairs advises the Minister for Foreign Affairs, the Ministers of State and the Government on all aspects of foreign policy and coordinates Ireland's response to international developments.

It also provides advice and support on all issues relevant to the pursuit of peace, partnership and reconciliation in Northern Ireland, and between North and South of the island, and to deepening Ireland's relationship with Britain."

List of office-holders

Notes

References

External links
Minister for Foreign Affairs

Foreign relations of Ireland
Government ministers of the Republic of Ireland
Lists of government ministers of Ireland
Ireland, Foreign Affairs
 
Ireland
Minister